The following is a list of Obstacle course racing (OCR) events/series across the world.

References

Obstacle racing